Đăm Săn (in Ê Đê: Klei Khan Y Dam San; in Vietnamese: Trường ca Đam San)(klei khan: epic, Y: middle name of Ede people for male, literally: The Great Epic of Sir Dam San) is a famous seven-chapter epic of the Ede people of Vietnam's Central Highlands. It is about the heroic E De chieftain Dam San.

Content
As of Chuê nuê custom (literally meaning "tying strings", in which the widow must marry her deceased spouse's blood-linked male. This is a custom typical of matriarchal systems), Đam San was forced to marry Hnhí and Hbhí who were sisters with each other. However, he refused to comply. To punish him, the chieftain tapped on Đam San's head 7 times with his smoking pipe, killing him immediately. After the chieftain brought Đam San back to life, Đam San had to follow the tradition and married the two sisters. He defeated two powerful chieftains, Mtao Grư (Eagle Chieftain) and Mtao Mxây (Iron Chieftain), who had kidnapped his wives. With this victory and the acquisition of many slaves, Đam San became a wealthy and powerful chieftain. As a stubborn man who slighted the gods, he chopped down the smuk tree-the life tree of his wives' line of blood. Incidentally, the tree fell down on the wives and killed them. Filled with grief, Đam San came to heaven with an axe, planning to cut the God's head. The God directed him to bring life to his wives. At that time, Đam San was the most powerful chieftain; however, he was displeased. His aspiration is catching Goddess The Sun and getting married with her. Đam San, at last, was failed and died because of his frenzied desire. His spirit changed into a fly and flew into his sister's mouth causing her getting pregnant. Dam San The Nephew was born and continued to "get tied up with" Hnhí and Hbhí and went on to do his uncle's unfinished work.

Genre 

This epic is written in klei đuê meter.

Example:

Popular culture 

This epic has inspired the composition of these songs in Vietnamese language: "Đi tìm lời ru Mặt Trời" (literally: "Finding out the lullaby of the Sun", author: Y Phôn K'sor) and "Vòng tay Đam San" (literally: "The open arm of Dam San", author: Trương Ngọc Ninh).

See also 

 Ede people

References

External links

Vietnamese
 Đam San going on screen
Gong image in Dam San epic
Better understanding Central Highland cultural essence through Dam San epic
 An alternative version of Đam San

Vietnamese poems
Epic poems